Things Can Only Get Better may refer to:

 "Things Can Only Get Better" (Howard Jones song)
 "Things Can Only Get Better" (D:Ream song)
 "Things Can Only Get Better", song by Kylie Minogue from Rhythm of Love 
 Things Can Only Get Better, book by John O'Farrell